In the arts, Idealism encourages imagination and attempts to realize a mental conception of beauty, a standard of perfection. Juxtaposed to aesthetic naturalism and realism.

See also
 Jean Delville
 Le Fils des étoiles
 Vienna School of Art History

References

Art movements
Visual arts theory
Art history